Tampere University (shortened TAU) is a Finnish university that was established on 1 January, 2019 as a merger between the University of Tampere and Tampere University of Technology. The new university is also the major shareholder of Tampere University of Applied Sciences.

History
University of Tampere was founded in 1925 as the Civic College in Helsinki teaching public administration, organisation management and journalism. In 1930, a total of 195 students were enrolled at the College and its name was amended to the School of Social Sciences. As the institution grew, it expanded to municipal administration, public law, child protection, and civic education. Faculty of Social Sciences was established in 1949 as the first faculty. By 1960, the number of students had increased to 933 and the School of Social Sciences moved to Tampere. The institution was renamed to the University of Tampere in 1966.

Tampere had been the most important industrial center in Finland since the late 19th century. Agathon Meurman, member of the senate of Finland, had expressed the need for a technical higher institution already in the mid-19th century. Yet, even after the continuation war all technical higher education was conducted in Helsinki University of Technology. Urho Kekkonen, the President of Finland, signed an edict for establishing a Tampere-based branch of the Helsinki University of Technology in 1965. The school began operating on the same year. The branch gained independent university status in 1972 and was named as Tampere University of Technology.

The two universities always had close relations and co-operation was common in the fields of economics, computer science, biotechnology, and medical technology. Therefore, merging the universities had been suggested multiple times. The Tampere3 merger process began in 2014 when vuorineuvos Stig Gustavson invited the higher education institutions in Tampere to discuss a reform. In 2015, the three universities decided the objectives on creating the new university in Tampere. In 2016, the Ministry of Education and Culture appointed a steering, and a working group to prepare the establishment of a new foundation university. Initially Tampere University of Applied Sciences was planned to merge into the new foundation, similarly to the other two universities. However, this would have required changes to legislation since Universities of Applied Sciences, or polytechnics, are not considered as Universities, in Finland, which can grant licentiate and doctorate degrees. The merger of the two universities was approved by the Finnish Parliament in December 2017 and came into effect on 1 January 2019. The university commune (TUNI) comprises the new Tampere University and the Tampere University of Applied Sciences, of which Tampere University is the major shareholder. 

In 2021 it was announced that Tampere University is trying to get rid of a large part of its premises. The goal is to reduce farms by 25% by 2030. This includes closing the University Library. The announcement was met with protest from faculty staff and students as they felt that there is a lack of transparency in the design of this decision, and that their voices were not heard in the matter.

Organisation

Faculties 
Tampere University comprises the following faculties:

 Faculty of Information Technology and Communication Sciences
 Faculty of Management and Business
 Faculty of Education and Culture
 Faculty of Medicine and Health Technology
 Faculty of Built Environment
 Faculty of Engineering and Natural Sciences
 Faculty of Social Sciences

Other units 

 Language Centre
 Library
 Teacher Training School
 Tampere University Hospital, a teaching hospital affiliated with Tampere University

Academics

Studies
A total of 21,500 degree students studied at the Tampere University in 2021, including 18,800 students in bachelor's and  master's degree programmes, and 2,700 students in doctoral degree programmes. Additionally 1,600 students are completing medical specialty training. In 2019, the university received 28,265 applications of whom 2,977 were enrolled for an admission rate of 11%. During that same year, the university was the second most applied university in Finland only bested by the University of Helsinki.

Research
Tampere University is primarily a research university, whereas, Tampere University of Applied Sciences focuses on development. Pre-merger multidisciplinary collaboration was mainly conducted between the fields of signal processing, biotechnology and medical technology at the Institute of Biosciences and Medical Technology (BioMediTech). The University states that it aims to become a globally recognized research community in the areas of technology, health, and society research. The university has ten Finnish Centres of Excellence:

 HEX – History of Experience
 SPARG – Spaces of Political Agency
 Gamecult – Game Culture Studies
 AgeCare – Ageing and Care Research
 CoETG – Cancer Research
 FinMIT – Mitochondria, Metabolism and Disease Research
 CoEBoC – Body-on-Chip Research
 ProLipids – Biomembrane Research
 COMP – Computational Nanoscience Research
 Inverse Problems Research

The University also comprises a single Nordic Centre of Excellence:

 NordSTEVA – Security and Safety Research

Furthermore, the University coordinates Academy of Finland's flagship programme on Photonics Research and Innovation (PREIN).

Notable people and alumni
 Jyrki Katainen – M.Soc.Sc., Prime Minister of Finland
 Sanna Marin – M.Sc. (Admin.), Prime Minister of Finland
 Mika Lintilä – B.Sc. (Admin.), Minister of Finance of Finland
 Kalevi Sorsa – M.Soc.Sc., the longest-reigning Prime Minister of Finland
 Paula Risikko – D.Sc. (Health Care), Minister of Interior of Finland
 Sampo Terho – M.A. (History), Minister for European Affairs, Culture and Sports of Finland
 Satu Hassi – L.Sc. (Tech.), Minister of Environment of Finland
 Hailemariam Desalegn –  M.Sc. (Tech.), Prime Minister of Ethiopia
 Rainer Mahlamäki – M.Sc. (Arch.), Architect
 Mikko Kaasalainen – D.Phil., Mathematician
 Kari Jormakka – D.Phil., Architect
 Jouko Karvinen – M.Sc. (Tech.), CEO of Stora Enso
 Matti Kähkönen – M.Sc. (Tech.), President and CEO of Metso
 Jarmo Kekäläinen – M.Sc. (Econ.), general manager of the Columbus Blue Jackets
 Mariina Hallikainen – B.Sc. (Tech.), CEO of Colossal Order
 Hille Korhonen – M.Sc. (Tech.), CEO of Nokian Tyres
 Kari Neilimo – D.Sc. (Econ.), Vuorineuvos and former CEO of S Group

References

External links

minedu.fi/en - Ministry of Education and Culture
oph.fi/english - Finnish National Agency for Education

 
Universities and colleges in Finland
Buildings and structures in Finland
2019 establishments in Finland
Educational institutions established in 2019
Education in Pirkanmaa
Tampere